George Serdula (January 17, 1920 – October 26, 2002) was an American football player, coach, and university professor.  He served as the head football coach at Ball State Teachers College—now Ball State University—from 1953 to 1955, compiling a record of 14–9–1.  Serdula played college football at Muskingum College, from which he graduated in 1942.  He served in the United States Army Air Forces during World War II as a flight engineer, and held the rank of first lieutenant.  Serdula resigned at football coach at Ball State in March 1956 to complete a doctoral degree at Indiana University.  He was later a professor of health sciences at St. Cloud State University.  Serdula was inducted into the died on Muskingum Hall of Fame in 1993.  He died on October 26, 2002 in St. Cloud, Minnesota.

Head coaching record

College

References

1920 births
2002 deaths
Ball State Cardinals football coaches
Muskingum Fighting Muskies football players
High school football coaches in Ohio
St. Cloud State University faculty
United States Army Air Forces personnel of World War II
United States Army Air Forces soldiers
Indiana University alumni